Vethiyarvettu is a village in the Udayarpalayam taluk of Ariyalur district, Tamil Nadu, India.

Demographics 

As per the 2001 census, Vethiyarvettu had a total population of 3187 with 1594 males and 1593 females.

Lake
 Cholangan Lake
 Ambalavanan lake

Temples
 Mariyamman kovil (west)
 Mariyamman kovil (east)
 Periyanayagi kovil
 Muneeswaran kovil
 Sangali Karppu kovil
 Veeranar kovil

Vanniyar kula khathriyar, Scheduled Castes and Scheduled Tribes the population respectively.

References 

Villages in Ariyalur district